Love Shagun is a 2016 Indian Hindi-language romantic comedy movie starring Anuj Sachdeva, Nidhi Subbaiah, Vikram Kochhar, Manit Joura, Taran Bajaj, Shamin Mannan and Simpy Singh.

Production
Love Shagun has been shot in various locations like Goa, Mumbai and Bhopal. A wedding song was filmed at Madh Island. The casting of the film has been done by casting director Taran Bajaj. The shoot of the film began in 2015 and the movie was released on 26 February 2016.

Plot
J.D., a young man is at an important stage in his life of choosing a life partner. Looking like a plain situation which all youngsters go through, JD is accompanied by an unusual combination of problems, one of a persistent pressure of marriage from his mother and second of the astrological predictions surrounding them. Caught in a fix, JD fights the battle with his three friends, Sandy, Sumit and Deepak who have their own definitions of love. All three friends try different solutions to get JD's life sorted and plan to find a girl for him whom he can divorce. JD in the middle follows all the tricks and plans and ends up meeting Tia, a modern and independent girl who follows her own mind. But much to their surprise, the story unfolds differently and JD finds himself in a larger soup than he had imagined. Between following his mother or his heart, JD is caught in a problem that does not seem easy to solve.

Cast
 Anuj Sachdeva as J.D. 
 Nidhi Subbaiah as Tia
 Shamin Mannan as Shama
 Simpy Singh as Moon
Manit Joura as Sandy
 Vikram Kochhar as Deepak
 Taran Bajaj as Sumit
 Anoop Gautam as Manjle
 Swastika Chakraborty as Tia's Mom

Soundtrack

Kunal Ganjawala, Arijit Singh, Tochi Raina, Sakina Khan, Aditi Singh Sharma have sung for the album. Zee Music Company has bought the music rights of the film. Music Composition is by Rishi-Siddharth, Ashish Pandit and Band of Bandagi. 
Rishi-Siddharth is the composer of "Saathiya",  "Hairaani" and "Coffee"  songs, while Ashish Pandit is the composer of "Hichkiyaan" and  "Kalol Ho Gaya" song is composed by Band of Bandagi.

References

External links
 
 

2016 films
2010s Hindi-language films